

Events 
March 27 Johann Sebastian Bach revives his St Mark Passion with some textual changes and two new arias inserted at St. Thomas Church, Leipzig.
Castrato Giovanni Carestini goes to work for Maria Theresa of Austria.

Classical music 
Thomas Arne 
The Death of Abel (oratorio)
Judith (first performed, published 1761)
Johann Sebastian Bach – Das wohltemperierte Klavier, part 2
Carl Philipp Emanuel Bach 
Keyboard Sonata in E major, H.39
Harpsichord Concerto in F major, H.415
Harpsichord Concerto in E major, H.417
Michele Blavet – Premier recueil de pieces
Michael Christian Festing – 6 Violin Sonatas, Op.7
Christoph Graupner  
Trio Sonata in C minor, GWV 203
Trio Sonata in D major, GWV 204
Sonata in G major, GWV 212
Trio Sonata in B minor, GWV 219
Concerto for 2 Flutes in E minor, GWV 322
Concerto for 2 Horns in G major, GWV 332
Bassoon Concerto in B-flat major, GWV 340
 Johann Adolph Hasse – 6 Flute Sonatas, Op. 5
Johann Ludwig Krebs
 Clavier-Übung I, Krebs-WV 500-512
 Clavier-Übung II, Krebs-WV 800
 Clavier-Übung III, Krebs-WV 801-806
 Etienne Mangean – 6 Sonatas for 2 Violins, Op. 3
 Niccolò Pasquali – 6 Sonatas for Violin, Op. 1
 John Frederick Ranish – 12 Flute Sonatas, Op. 2
Johan Helmich Roman – Drottningholm Music (Music for a Royal Wedding)
Domenico Natale Sarro – Recorder Sonata in F major
Georg Phillip Telemann – Jauchzet, ihr Himmel, TWV 1:957
Francesco Maria Veracini 
L'errore di Salomone (oratorio)
12 Sonate accademiche, Op. 2 (for violin)
 Jan Dismas Zelenka 
 Litaniae Lauretanae, ZWV 151
 Litaniae Lauretanae, ZWV 152

Opera
Daniele Dal Barba – Il Tigrane
Christoph Willibald Gluck  
La Sofonisba, Wq.5
Ipermestra, Wq. 7
George Frideric Handel – Semele
Johann Adolph Hasse 
Antigono
Semiramide riconosciuta
John Frederick Lampe – The Kiss Accepted and Returned

Publications 

 Carl Philipp Emanuel Bach – 6 Harpsichord Sonatas, Wq.49  (Nuremberg: Johann Ulrich Haffner) (composed 1742-44)
Delphin Strungk (some copies were made in this year, though the composer died in 1694)
Lass mich dein sein und bleiben
Meine Seele erhebt den Herren

Methods and theory writings 

 Johan Daniel Berlin – Musicaliske Elementer (Trondheim: Jens Christ)

Births 
May 3 – Friedrich Wilhelm Weis, composer
May 4 – Marianna Martines, singer, pianist and composer (d. 1812)
May 18 – Joseph Beer, composer and clarinetist (died 1812)
May 19 – Queen Charlotte of Mecklenburg-Strelitz, regular patron of Mozart's (died 1818)
August 4 – Julije Bajamonti (died 1800)
August 25 – Johann Gottfried Herder, librettist and philosopher (died 1803)
November 26 – Karl Siegmund von Seckendorff (died 1785)
December 8 – Pierre-Joseph Candeille, French composer (died 1827)
date unknown
Marie Barch, first native Danish ballerina (d. 1827)
Gaetano Brunetti, Italian composer (died 1798)
Francesco Petrini, composer and musician (died 1819)
Charles le Picq, French dancer and choreographer (d. 1806)

Deaths 
January 14 – Charles-Hubert Gervais, composer (born 1671)
January 20 – Richard Jones, violinist and composer
February 15 – František Václav Míča, conductor and composer (born 1694)
March 22 – Georg Lenck, German musician (born 1685)
April 26 – Domenico Sarro, Italian composer (born 1679)
May 9 – Johann Samuel Beyer (born 1669)
May 30 – Alexander Pope, English poet (born 1688)
June 29 – André Campra, composer (born 1660)
August 19 – Carlo Arrigoni (born 1697)
October 17 – Giuseppe Guarneri, violin-maker (born 1698)
October 23 – Pierre-Charles Roy, librettist and poet (born 1683)
October 31 – Leonardo Leo, composer (born 1694)
December 29 – Pompeo Cannicciari (born 1670) 
date unknown
Claude Balon, dancer and choreographer
Gennaro Antonio Federico, Italian librettist 
James Miller, librettist and playwright (born 1704)
Francesca Vanini-Boschi, operatic contralto  

 
18th century in music
Music by year